The 1965 NHL Amateur Draft was the third NHL Entry Draft. It was a draft to assign unaffiliated amateur junior-age players to NHL teams. It was held on April 27, 1965, at the Queen Elizabeth Hotel in Montreal, Quebec.

For the first time the eligibility rules were changed for the 1965 draft. The minimum age criterion was increased, to 18 from 16 years. Clubs were not permitted to begin negotiations with the selected players until they reached 19 years of age, and the date from which they were ineligible due to being on club sponsorship lists was pushed back from May 23 to April 1.

The NHL also reached an agreement with the AHL, CHL and WHL, allowing their clubs to participate in the draft. After the NHL clubs made their selections the clubs from the other three leagues were permitted to make their own selections. Each AHL and WHL club was allowed three picks, while each CHL team was allowed two.

The general consensus on the part of each participatory club was that the talent pool from which to draft was exceptionally poor. The majority of amateur players falling within the new age rules had already been sponsored, if not turned professional. 11 picks were made, which to this date remains the lowest ever in an NHL draft. Only two players played in the NHL: Pierre Bouchard and Michel Parizeau.

The pool of available player talent was considered so poor that the Toronto Maple Leafs elected not to participate whatsoever. The only non-NHL club to exercise their right to make a selection was the Pittsburgh Hornets of the AHL, who picked Junior C player Gary Beattie with the 11th, final pick.

Selections by round
Below are listed the selections in the 1965 NHL amateur draft.

Round one

Round two

Round three

See also
 1965–66 NHL season
 List of NHL players

Citations

References

External links
 1965 NHL amateur draft player stats at The Internet Hockey Database
 HockeyDraftCentral.com

Draft
National Hockey League Entry Draft